Vertigo Films is a British television and film production company based in London, England. Vertigo Films has been responsible for the production and distribution of Bronson, StreetDance 3D, and Monsters. It now focuses solely on the production of television series, with subsidiary company Vertigo Releasing taking over film distribution.

History
Vertigo Films was created in July 2002, by producers Allan Niblo (producer of Human Traffic and South West 9) and James Richardson (producer of Kiss Kiss (Bang Bang)).

Director Nick Love (screenwriter and, prior to company formation, director of Goodbye Charlie Bright and The Football Factory) and distributor Rupert Preston (distributor of Chopper, Chasing Amy and Bride of Chucky, among others) joined a year later, while entrepreneur Rob Morgan began investment in November 2004.

The company was formed for the express purpose of distributing and producing two films, The Football Factory and It's All Gone Pete Tong. Vertigo Films's film releases were distributed on home video by Entertainment One. Vertigo Films teamed up with Film4 and Ingenious Media in January 2008, to form a sales company called Protagonist Pictures. They also own a post production company in Berlin called The Post Republic.

Having built up one of the most successful feature film businesses in the United Kingdom, encompassing production, distribution, sales and post production, the company is now solely concentrating on television production. Film distribution is currently handled by Vertigo Releasing, launched in 2014, for the sole purpose of acquiring films for release.

Its first two shows, Britannia and Bulletproof, were commissioned by Sky, with both programmes renewed for a second series.

In May 2021 Bulletproof was cancelled by Sky following extensive allegations  of on-set bullying and sexual misconduct against actor and executive producer Noel Clarke.

Filmography

Television shows

Released films

Awards
It's All Gone Pete Tong:
 Best Canadian Feature – Toronto International Film Festival – 2004
 Best Feature – US Comedy Arts Festival – 2005
 Best Actor (Paul Kaye) – US Comedy Arts Festival – 2005
 Grand Jury Award – Gen Art Film Festival – 2005
 Audience Award – Gen Art Film Festival – 2005
 Best British Columbian Film – Vancouver Film Critics Circle – 2005
 Best Male Performer' (Mike Wilmot) – Canadian Comedy Awards – 2005
 Best Overall Sound – Leo Awards – 2005
 Best Sound Editing – Leo Awards – 2005
 Best Feature-Length Drama – Leo Awards – 2005

Clean:
 Best Actress (Maggie Cheung) – Cannes Film Festival – 2004

London to Brighton:
Best Achievement in Production – British Independent Film Awards – 2006
Golden Hitchcock (Paul Andrew Williams) – Dinard Festival of British Cinema – 2006
New Director's Award (Paul Andrew Williams) – Edinburgh International Film Festival – 2006
Most Promising Newcomer (Paul Andrew Williams) – Evening Standard British Film Awards – 2007
Best Feature Film – Foyle Film Festival – 2006
Jury Prize (UK Feature) – Raindance Film Festival – 2006

Shotgun Stories:
New American Cinema Award – Seattle International Film Festival – 2007

Bronson:
 Best Actor Tom Hardy – British Independent Film Awards – 2009
 Best Film – Sydney Film Festival – 2009

Monsters:
Best International Film – Saturn Award —2011
Best First Film – Austin Film Critics Association – 2010
Best Achievement in Production – British Independent Film Awards – 2010
Best Director – British Independent Film Awards – 2010
Best Technical Achievement Gareth Edwards For visual effects – British Independent Film Awards – 2010
Best Technical/Artistic Achievement Gareth Edwards For the Cinematography, Production Design and Visual Effects – Evening Standard British Film Awards – 2010
Breakthrough British Filmmaker for Gareth Edwards – London Film Critics' Circle – 2011
Top Independent Films – National Board of Review of Motion Pictures – 2010

References

External links
 Vertigo Films

Vertigo Films films
Film distributors of the United Kingdom
Film production companies of the United Kingdom
Mass media companies established in 2002
Mass media companies based in London